Elizabeth Coleman is president of Bennington College.

Elizabeth Coleman may also refer to:

 Elizabeth A. Coleman, inspector general of the Federal Reserve Board
 Bessie Coleman (1892–1926), aviator
 One Life to Live miscellaneous characters#Liz Coleman Reynolds
Betty Coleman, The Walking Dead character